Desmond Park (1 April 1936 – 14 October 2019) was a New Zealand cricketer. He played in three first-class matches for Central Districts in 1957/58.

See also
 List of Central Districts representative cricketers

References

External links
 

1936 births
2019 deaths
New Zealand cricketers
Central Districts cricketers
People from Inglewood, New Zealand